The 2016 Hockey India League (HIL) (known as Coal India Hockey India League for sponsorship reasons) is the fourth season of the professional field hockey tournament. The Hockey India League began on 18 January and concluded with Punjab Warriors as champion against Kalinga Lancers in the final on 21 February.

Teams

Players auction
There were a total of 271 players available during the auction in Delhi, 135 being Indian players and 136 being foreign. Akashdeep Singh was won by Uttar Pradesh Wizards for $84,000 while Moritz Fürste was won by Kalinga Lancers for $105,000.

Rule changes for 2016
The organizers of Hockey India League announced changes in rules for the 2016 edition. The changes put the focus firmly back on the more traditional art of scoring. The weightage for field goals were double compared to the goals scored from penalty corners, meaning a field goal would count as two while successfully converted short corner would still be considered as one goal. It was called a pilot project, and if successful, would also be introduced globally.

Standings

Results table

First to fourth place classification

Semi-finals

Third and fourth place

Final

Awards

References

External links

  
Hockey India League seasons
India
Hockey